Blackjack is the eponymous debut album of the American rock band Blackjack. The album was recorded shortly after the band's formation in early 1979 at Criteria Studios in Miami and released on Polydor Records on June 18, 1979.

Official music videos were recorded for the album's two singles, "Love Me Tonight" and "Without Your Love" and the album was promoted moderately by Polydor. The album was met with lukewarm reception and the band would disband in 1980 after recording a second studio album, Worlds Apart.

The album was art directed by Abie Sussman and the cover artwork was designed and drawn by Gerard Huerta.

The album reached #127 on the Billboard album charts in 1979, and the lead single, "Love Me Tonight", reached #62 on the Hot 100 that same year.

Track listing

CD re-issues
 1990 Blackjack / Worlds Apart (PolyGram, 843 335-2)
 1996 Blackjack / Worlds Apart (Polydor K.K. Japan, POCP-2416)
 2006 Anthology [Blackjack / Worlds Apart] (Lemon, CD LEM84)
 2013 Blackjack (Universal Music Japan, UICY-75998)

Personnel
Michael Bolton - lead & backing vocals
Bruce Kulick - lead & rhythm guitars
Jimmy Haslip - bass, backing vocals
Sandy Gennaro - drums, percussion

Additional personnel
Jan Mullaney - keyboards
Chuck Kirkpatrick - backing vocals
Tonny Battaglia - backing vocals
Eric Troyer - backing vocals
Tom Dowd - production
Steve Gursky - engineering
Mike Fuller - mastering

References

1979 debut albums
Albums produced by Tom Dowd
Polydor Records albums